The 1938 Arizona Wildcats football team represented the University of Arizona in the Border Conference during the 1938 college football season.  In their first and only season under head coach Orian Landreth, the Wildcats compiled a 3–6 record (0–3 against Border opponents), finished in fifth place in the conference, and were outscored by their opponents, 146 to 75. The team captain was George Ahee.  The team played its home games at Arizona Stadium in Tucson, Arizona.

Schedule

References

Arizona
Arizona Wildcats football seasons
Arizona Wildcats football